Meropenem, sold under the brand name Merrem among others, is an intravenous β-lactam antibiotic used to treat a variety of bacterial infections. Some of these include meningitis, intra-abdominal infection, pneumonia, sepsis, and anthrax. 

Common side effects include nausea, diarrhea, constipation, headache, rash, and pain at the site of injection. Serious side effects include Clostridioides difficile infection, seizures, and allergic reactions including anaphylaxis. Those who are allergic to other β-lactam antibiotics are more likely to be allergic to meropenem as well. Use in pregnancy appears to be safe. It is in the carbapenem family of medications. Meropenem usually results in bacterial death through blocking their ability to make a cell wall. It is more resistant to breakdown by β-lactamase producing bacteria.

Meropenem was patented in 1983. It was approved for medical use in the United States in 1996. It is on the World Health Organization's List of Essential Medicines. The World Health Organization classifies meropenem as critically important for human medicine.

Medical uses 
The spectrum of action includes many Gram-positive and Gram-negative bacteria (including Pseudomonas) and  anaerobic bacteria. The overall spectrum is similar to that of imipenem, although meropenem is more active against Enterobacteriaceae and less active against Gram-positive bacteria. It works against extended-spectrum β-lactamases, but may be more susceptible to metallo-β-lactamases. Meropenem is frequently given in the treatment of febrile neutropenia. This condition frequently occurs in patients with hematological malignancies and cancer patients receiving anticancer drugs that suppress bone marrow formation. It is approved for complicated skin and skin structure infections, complicated intra-abdominal infections and bacterial meningitis.

In 2017, the U.S. Food and Drug Administration (FDA) granted approval for the combination of meropenem and vaborbactam to treat adults with complicated urinary tract infections.

Administration
Meropenem is administered intravenously as a white crystalline powder to be dissolved in 5% monobasic potassium phosphate solution. Dosing must be adjusted for altered kidney function and for haemofiltration.

As with other β-lactams antibiotics, the effectiveness of treatment depends on the amount of time during the dosing interval that the meropenem concentration is above the minimum inhibitory concentration for the bacteria causing the infection. For β-lactams, including meropenem, prolonged intravenous administration is associated with lower mortality than bolus intravenous infusion in persons with whose infections are severe, or caused by bacteria that are less sensitive to meropenem, such as Pseudomonas aeruginosa.

Side effects
The most common adverse effects are diarrhea (4.8%), nausea and vomiting (3.6%), injection-site inflammation (2.4%), headache (2.3%), rash (1.9%) and thrombophlebitis (0.9%). Many of these adverse effects were observed in severely ill individuals already taking many medications including vancomycin.  Meropenem has a reduced potential for seizures in comparison with imipenem. Several cases of severe hypokalemia have been reported.

Interactions
Meropenem rapidly reduces serum concentrations of valproic acid. As a result, people who use valproic acid for epilepsy are at increased risk of seizures during treatment with meropenem. In situations where the use of meropenem cannot be avoided, prescription of an additional anticonvulsant should be considered.

Pharmacology

Mechanism of action
Meropenem is bactericidal except against Listeria monocytogenes, where it is bacteriostatic. It inhibits bacterial cell wall synthesis like other β-lactam antibiotics. In contrast to other beta-lactams, it is highly resistant to degradation by β-lactamases or cephalosporinases. In general, resistance arises due to mutations in penicillin-binding proteins, production of metallo-β-lactamases, or resistance to diffusion across the bacterial outer membrane. Unlike imipenem, it is stable to dehydropeptidase-1, so can be given without cilastatin.

In 2016, a synthetic peptide-conjugated PMO (PPMO) was found to inhibit the expression of New Delhi metallo-beta-lactamase, an enzyme that many drug-resistant bacteria use to destroy carbapenems.

Society and culture

Trade names

References

External links
 

Carbapenem antibiotics
Enantiopure drugs
Carboxamides
AstraZeneca brands
Pyrrolidines
Secondary alcohols
World Health Organization essential medicines
Wikipedia medicine articles ready to translate